SYW or syw may refer to:

 SYW, the ICAO code for SkyAirWorld, a defunct airline based in Brisbane, Australia
 syw, the ISO 639-3 code for Kagate language, Nepal